Chilton House is a historic home located at St. Albans, Kanawha County, West Virginia.  It was built in 1857, and is a "T"-shaped brick dwelling in the Gothic Revival style.  The roof structure has a total of seven gables, three in the head and four in the leg of its "T" shape.

In 1883, the house became the property of William and Mary Chilton, whose son Senator William E. Chilton (1858-1939) was a frequent visitor.

The house was moved in 1975, approximately 200 yards to its new location and set on a cinder block and sandstone foundation.

It was listed on the National Register of Historic Places in 1977.

Currently, the building is occupied by Angela’s On The River, a family restaurant.

References

Gothic Revival architecture in West Virginia
Houses completed in 1857
Houses in Kanawha County, West Virginia
Houses on the National Register of Historic Places in West Virginia
National Register of Historic Places in Kanawha County, West Virginia
1857 establishments in Virginia
St. Albans, West Virginia